Phineas and Ferb: Across the 2nd Dimension is a video game based on the TV movie of the same name and the first multi-platform game in the Phineas and Ferb video game series. It was released in August 2011 on most seventh generation platforms to coincide with the premiere of the film, followed a year later by a PlayStation Portable version.

Gameplay
The PS3, Wii and PSP versions allow the players to play as Phineas, Ferb, Perry, Agent T, Second Dimension Phineas and Second Dimension Ferb as the major characters while unlocking Isabella, Baljeet, Peter the Panda and Pinky the Chihuahua by collecting tickets from mini games. Players will have the option to work together in two-player cooperative modes while navigating through an old time 1928-style cartoon world, a lawn gnome land, a balloon world, and a gelatin world. In a mission to save the world, players will journey through 25 levels while overcoming obstacles. They also can upgrade new gadgets including the Carbonator, which fires carbonated orange soda that can melt enemies and Ninja Gloves, which allows players to stick to walls. The PlayStation 3 version is the first time a Phineas and Ferb video game features PlayStation Move motion controller compatible gameplay.

In the DS version, they can play as Phineas, Ferb, and Agent P. Players will jump, dodge, race and battle through five outrageous worlds featuring more than 30 levels. Players will work to earn gadget upgrades, including a baseball launcher and Agent P's favorite gadget – the grapple gun, while solving environmental puzzles in an effort to save Alternate Danville. The DS version has a significant difference from the previous DS games in the series, as it focuses more on platforming than collecting items.

Development
After the release of the first video game, it was revealed that a Phineas and Ferb Wii game was in development. Later, Disney Germany confirmed a PS3, Wii, and DS game for the series to be in development. The game was officially announced in April 2011 as an Across the 2nd Dimension video game adaptation. The game was featured at a video game press event in New York City in April, alongside other games such as Lego Pirates of the Caribbean: The Video Game. The title was also playable at the event.

In an article of Kotaku, it was noted that the console versions of the game borrow elements from the Ratchet & Clank games. This is due to High Impact Games, the game's developer, being a spin-off company of Ratchet and Clank series creators Insomniac Games. Plans for an Xbox 360 version were scrapped due to difficulties with attempting to reproduce the gameplay of the Wii and PS3 versions, controlled with physical wand-based motion controllers, with the Kinect's unique camera-based controller,<ref>{{cite web |url=http://kotaku.com/5816583/ |title=Thank Ratchet and Clank for This Wonderful Disney Game |work=Kotaku |publisher=Gawker Media |date=June 29, 2011 |author=Crecente, Brian}}</ref> a similar problem that may have prevented wand-based motion controller games like The Lord of the Rings: Aragorn's Quest from being considered for development on that platform.

In June 2012, a PlayStation Portable version of the game was announced.

ReceptionPhineas and Ferb: Across the 2nd Dimension'' has received average to positive reviews. The game's visual design has been praised, with GamePro stating that the "environments [are] gorgeous" and GameSpot saying that "the entire game faithfully captures the whimsical look of the cartoon", but it has been criticized for its "very short campaign" and for being "extremely easy".

References

External links
Official website

2011 video games
Cancelled Xbox 360 games
Disney video games
Altron games
Nintendo DS games
Phineas and Ferb video games
PlayStation 3 games
PlayStation Move-compatible games
PlayStation Portable games
Sony Interactive Entertainment games
Video games about parallel universes
Video games based on films
Video games developed in Japan
Video games developed in the United States
Video games scored by Andrew Aversa
Wii games
3D platform games